The 1992 World Ringette Championships (1992 WRC) was an international ringette tournament, the 2nd (II) World Ringette Championships, and was organized by the World Ringette Council, the precursor to the International Ringette Federation (IRF). The tournament was contested in Helsinki, Finland, from March 4 to 8, 1992.

Teams from six different countries competed: Canada, Finland, the United States, Sweden, Russia, and France.

Overview
There were two Canadian ringette teams, Team Canada East and Team Canada West (Team Alberta "AAA"). Also present was Team Finland, Team USA, Team France, Team Sweden, and Team Russia.

Team Canada West won gold. Twelve members of Team Alberta were members of the Calgary Deb AA team.

Venue
The tournament was contested in Helsinki, Finland.

Teams

Final standings

Rosters

Team Finland
The 1992 Team Finland Senior team competed at the 1992 World Ringette Championships and won the bronze medal. The team won the won the bronze medal.  was a member of the winning team, but eventually stopped playing ringette after receiving a six-month suspension for kicking an opponent who was lying on the ice during a ringette game. The team also included Arja Oksanen, Satu Himberg, Marika Mäkinen, and Mia Melkinen.

Team Canada
Two teams represented Canada at the 1992 World Ringette Championships: Team Canada East and Team Canada West. Team Canada West (Team Alberta "AAA") included twelve members originating from the 1991–1992 Calgary Deb "AA" ringette team. Clémence Duchesneau of 1992 Team Canada East was named the tournament's top goalie.

Team Canada West
The 1992 Team Canada West team included the following:

Team USA

Max Feierstein was the head coach of Team USA.

See also
 World Ringette Championships
 International Ringette Federation
  Canada national ringette team
  Finland national ringette team
  Sweden national ringette team
  United States national ringette team

References

World Ringette Championships
Ringette
Ringette competitions